Matt Fincher is an American former college baseball coach and player. He served as head coach of the USC Upstate Spartans baseball program from 1998 until 2019. From 1997 to 2006, he was assistant coach of the Chatham Anglers of the Cape Cod Baseball League. His uniform number "23" was retired by Chatham in 2006. He hails from Athens, Georgia. On May 31, 2019, Fincher stepped down as the head coach at USC Upstate.

Head coaching record

References

Living people
Baseball coaches from Georgia (U.S. state)
Baseball catchers
Cape Cod Baseball League coaches
Eastern Illinois Panthers baseball coaches
Georgia Bulldogs baseball coaches
Georgia College Bobcats
Georgia Southern University alumni
Sportspeople from Athens, Georgia
USC Upstate Spartans baseball coaches
Wofford Terriers baseball players
Baseball coaches from South Carolina
Year of birth missing (living people)
Andrew College